Now That's What I Call Music! 9 was released on March 19, 2002. The album is the ninth edition of the (U.S.) Now! series. It debuted at number one on the Billboard 200 albums chart in April 2002. It is the fourth number-one album in the series and has been certified 2× Platinum by the RIAA.

The album was the first in the series to include radio remixes of some tracks, rather than the originals. It also features the song "Family Affair", the Billboard Hot 100 number-one single in this volume.

Track listing

Track variations
The version of "Get the Party Started" is a remix by Rockwilder using elements of the Eurythmics song "Sweet Dreams (Are Made of This)" and featuring rapper Redman, instead of the much more popular original version which was a hit in the United States (and continues to be popular and air on mainstream radio stations to this day).
The album version of "Ain't It Funny" is included, despite not being released as a single in the United States. The "Murder Remix" featuring Ja Rule is the version of the song released as a single (and subsequently reaching number one on the Billboard Hot 100) in the US.
The version of the Trackmasters remix of "Caramel" removes the third verse and goes straight from Ortiz's second verse to Eve's rap.
The album version of "Turn Off the Light" by Nelly Furtado is included over the popular remix featuring Ms. Jade and Timbaland.

Charts

Weekly charts

Year-end charts

References

2002 compilation albums
 009
Universal Music Group compilation albums